Cristian George Ganea (born 24 May 1992) is a Romanian professional footballer who plays as a left-back for Super League Greece club Panathinaikos.

After emerging through the Spanish football system, Ganea returned to Romania at age 21 and moved around several teams before settling at Viitorul Constanța. He won the national title in 2016–17 season with the latter, which prompted a transfer to Athletic Bilbao in 2018. He only made one La Liga appearance, serving loan spells at Numancia and back at Viitorul before being released and signing for Greek club Aris Thessaloniki in 2020.

Internationally, Ganea made his full debut for Romania in June 2017, in a 3–2 friendly victory over Chile.

Club career

Early career
Ganea moved from Romania to Spain with his family while still a minor. He grew up in Basauri where his relatives still live, and spent several years playing with Basque clubs making him eligible for Athletic Bilbao.

In 2010, Ganea signed for RCD Mallorca. After a year with their youth teams, he was assigned to the reserve squad, but was then loaned to local fourth-tier club CD Santanyí for one and a half seasons, during which he played regularly.

Return to Romania / Viitorul Constanța
In January 2013, Ganea returned to his country of birth to sign for second division club FCM Târgu Mureș. That summer he moved on to CS Universitatea Craiova in the same league, helping them to earn promotion in his sole campaign in Oltenia.

Ganea then transferred to Săgeata Năvodari, staying in the Liga II and this time enduring an administrative relegation as his club were deducted 42 points for unpaid debts and subsequently dissolved during mid-season. Ganea signed with FC Brașov for the latter part of the 2014–15 Liga I, but they too suffered relegation and experienced severe financial problems.

In the summer of 2015, Ganea moved to Viitorul Constanța, owned and coached by former Romanian international Gheorghe Hagi. In the 2015–16 season, the club finished fifth and qualified for the UEFA Europa League. The following campaign, he helped Viitorul win the Romanian league title for the first time in their short history. Ganea was a regular during both seasons, with 58 league starts. He also played in the club's early exits from the qualifying rounds of both the UEFA Champions League and UEFA Europa League.

Athletic Bilbao
On 15 January 2018, Athletic Bilbao announced the signing of Ganea on a three-year contract with the option of another year, with the player due to join the squad in the summer. Almost as soon as he arrived in Bilbao, the club signed Yuri Berchiche, who played in the same position and was immediately installed as first choice, with the previous regular Mikel Balenziaga also still with Athletic and ahead of Ganea in the queue for selection.

He made his debut on 28 November 2018 in a Copa del Rey game against Huesca, coming on as a substitute in the 73rd minute. Five days later, he made his La Liga debut in a 0–3 loss to Levante, being stretchered off with a torso injury early in the second half of the match, and was replaced by habitual starter Markel Susaeta.

On 9 January 2019, Ganea was loaned to Segunda División side Numancia until June. After playing regularly in Soria he returned to Athletic Bilbao, but was again afflicted by injuries and made no further appearances before being loaned again, this time back to his former club Viitorul Constanța, in January 2020. The season in Romania was soon postponed due to the COVID-19 pandemic and Ganea's loan spell expired before all fixtures were completed; he went back to Spain in July 2020 with a possibility of participating in Athletic's final few matches, which had also been delayed due to the pandemic, but he was not named in any match squads before the end of the campaign.

On 11 August 2020, Ganea's contract with Athletic was terminated.

Aris
On 14 August 2020, he joined Super League Greece side Aris on a two-year contract. On 28 February 2021, he scored his first goal for the club with an exquisite shot in a comfortable 3–0 home win against Atromitos.

International career
Ganea was called up to the Basque Country national under-18 team.

He made his full debut for Romania on 13 June 2017 in a friendly against Chile.

Personal life
Ganea does not hold Spanish citizenship yet. He regarded the Basques as "extraordinary people, with common sense and welcoming." He also praised the Basque Country, saying it's the cleanest and quietest in Spain and that its streets and infrastructure generally do not have a correspondent across the country.

Career statistics

Club

International

Honours
Universitatea Craiova
Liga II: 2013–14

Viitorul Constanța
Liga I: 2016–17
Supercupa României runner-up: 2017

References

External links

1992 births
Living people
Sportspeople from Bistrița
Romanian emigrants to Spain
Romanian footballers
Association football defenders
Association football midfielders
Tercera División players
Liga I players
Liga II players
La Liga players
Super League Greece players
RCD Mallorca B players
ASA 2013 Târgu Mureș players
CS Universitatea Craiova players
AFC Săgeata Năvodari players
FC Brașov (1936) players
FC Viitorul Constanța players
Athletic Bilbao footballers
CD Numancia players
Aris Thessaloniki F.C. players
Panathinaikos F.C. players
Romania international footballers
Romanian expatriate footballers
Expatriate footballers in Spain
Romanian expatriate sportspeople in Spain
Romanian expatriate sportspeople in Greece
Segunda División players
Expatriate footballers in Greece